The 2015–16 season was the 33rd season in Getafe CF 's history and the 12th in the top-tier.

Team information

Current squad

Staff and board
 Manager: Fran Escribá
 Assistant manager: Javier Casquero
 Goalkeeper coach: Emilio López
 Fitness coach: Oscar García Hermo
 President: Ángel Torres Sánchez
 Vice President: Agustín Clemente Alonso

Stadium information
Name – Coliseum Alfonso Pérez
City – Getafe
Capacity – 18,000
Inauguration – 1998
Pitch size – 105 x 68 m
Other Facilities: – Ciudad Deportiva

Kit information

Getafe wear their traditional blue strip. Small strips of white and red also tend to be incorporated in their kit. Generally, their away strip is red, however this has changed in recent years. Their shirt manufacturer is Joma.

Competitions

Overall

Overview

La Liga

League table

Results summary

Result round by round

Matches

See also
2015–16 La Liga

References

Getafe CF seasons
Getafe CF